
Year 263 (CCLXIII) was a common year starting on Thursday (link will display the full calendar) of the Julian calendar. At the time, it was known as the Year of the Consulship of Albinus and Dexter (or, less frequently, year 1016 Ab urbe condita). The denomination 263 for this year has been used since the early medieval period, when the Anno Domini calendar era became the prevalent method in Europe for naming years.

Events 
 By place 

 Roman Empire 
 King Odenathus of Palmyra declares himself ruler of the area west of the  River Euphrates and is declared Dux Orientalis by the Roman emperor Gallienus.

 Asia 
 Conquest of Shu by Wei: The Chinese state of Cao Wei conquers Shu Han, one of its two rival states.
 Sima Zhao, regent of the Cao Wei state, receives and accepts the nine bestowments, state chancellorship, and the title Duke of Jin from Cao Huan.

 By topic 

 Art and Science 
 Chinese mathematician Liu Hui writes a commentary on The Nine Chapters on the Mathematical Art, describing what will later be called Gaussian elimination, computing pi, etc.

Births

Deaths 
 Gao Rou (or Wenhui), Chinese politician (b. 174)
 Lady Li (or Lishi), Chinese noblewoman
 Liu Chen, Chinese prince of the Shu Han state
 Ruan Ji, Chinese poet and musician (b. 210)
 Zhuge Zhan, Chinese general and politician (b. 227)

References